The 2020 LPL season was the eighth year of China's League of Legends Pro League (LPL), a professional esports league for the MOBA PC game League of Legends.

The spring split began on 13 January, but was suspended after the first week of competition due to the COVID-19 pandemic in mainland China. The season resumed on 9 March with games being played online, However, several players could not play due to travel restrictions after they returned to their hometowns. and concluded with the spring finals on 2 May.

The summer split began on 5 June and concluded with the summer finals on 27 August.

Spring

Regular season

Playoffs

Summer

Regular season

Playoffs

World Championship qualification

Seeds 
 Seed 1: Qualifies for the 2020 World Championship main event as the winner of the 2020 LPL Summer Playoffs
 Seed 2: Qualifies for the 2020 World Championship main event as the team with the most Championship Points accumulated from the spring and summer splits
 Seed 3: Qualifies for the 2020 World Championship main event as the winner of the 2020 LPL Regional Finals
 Seed 4: Qualifies for the 2020 World Championship play-in stage as the runners-up of the 2020 LPL Regional Finals

Championship Points distribution 

1 Auto qualification as the LPL's first seed.

Regional Finals 
Excluding the first and second seeds, the remaining four teams with the most Championship Points qualify for the Regional Finals (if Championship Points are equal, the final seeding for the regional finals is determined by teams' summer season rankings).
 Team 1: Suning (70 pts)
 Team 2: LGD Gaming (40 pts)
 Team 3: Invictus Gaming (30 pts)
 Team 4: FunPlus Phoenix (30 pts)

Note: The winner of Round 1, Game 1 (i.e. Suning vs LGD Gaming) is the Regional Finals winner and the LPL's third seed at the World Championship. The winner of Round 2 is the Regional Finals runners-up and the LPL's fourth seed at the World Championship. The losers of Round 1, Game 2 (i.e. Invictus Gaming vs FunPlus Phoenix) and Round 2 are eliminated from World Championship contention.

References 

League of Legends
2020 multiplayer online battle arena tournaments
League of Legends Pro League seasons
League of Legends Pro League season, 2020